An election to the County Council of London took place on 6 March 1919. It was the tenth triennial election of the whole Council. The size of the council was increased to 124 councillors and 20 aldermen. The councillors were elected for electoral divisions corresponding to the new parliamentary constituencies that had been created by the Representation of the People Act 1918. There were 60 dual-member constituencies and one four-member constituency. The council was elected by First Past the Post, with each elector having two votes in the dual-member seats.

National government background
The prime minister of the day was the Liberal David Lloyd George. who had just led a Coalition Government that included the Unionist Party and some Liberals and Socialists to a general election victory three months earlier, with the help of a Coalition government 'coupon'.

London Council background
Although the Municipal Reform Party had won an overall majority at the last elections in 1913, in line with national politics, they decided late in 1917 to form a war-time coalition to mirror the national government. Some Progressive Party members were offered chairmanships of committees. This coalition had continued after the war ended.

Candidates

There was no County wide electoral agreements between any of the parties, though clearly there had been some locally agreed situations. There were very few constituencies where all three parties stood two candidates. In the past, the Progressive Party had encompassed the Labour Party, with candidates running in harness. That situation was becoming less common. A few Progressive candidates ran in harness with Municipal Reform candidates but there was no 'coupon' in operation for the two 'coalition parties' who frequently ran candidates against each other. Among the defeated candidates were future Labour Leader Clement Attlee and future Conservative Chief Whip David Margesson

Outcome
The Municipal Reform Party won an overall majority of seats, electing 68 councillors. They only lost one seat, to an Independent candidate. (The defeated candidate was made an Alderman after the election) As before they decided to operate a form of Coalition with the Progressives. Labour made a substantial advance in terms of seats, but remained the third party. There was just one Independent elected.

Constituency results

Battersea
Incumbent Councillors shown in bold.

Bermondsey

Bethnal Green

Camberwell

Chelsea

City of London

Deptford

Finsbury

Fulham

Greenwich

Hackney

Hammersmith

Hampstead

Holborn

Islington

Kensington

Lambeth

Lewisham

Paddington

Poplar

St Marylebone

St Pancras

N.B.: Davies had been an outgoing councillor for St Pancras South, Claremont and Walker were outgoing councillors for St Pancras East

Shoreditch

Southwark

Stepney

Stoke Newington

Wandsworth

Westminster

Woolwich

Aldermen
In addition to the 124 councillors the council consisted of 20 county aldermen. Aldermen were elected by the council, and served a six-year term. Half of the aldermanic bench were elected every three years following the triennial council election. After the elections, there were eleven Aldermanic vacancies and the following Alderman were appointed by the newly elected council;
Louis Courtauld, Municipal Reform (defeated Councillor at Lambeth North)
John William Gilbert, Municipal Reform (re-appointed)
Bernard Henry Holland, Municipal Reform (re-appointed)
Sir Cyril Jackson, Municipal Reform (former Alderman)
Howard Willmott Liversidge, Municipal Reform (re-appointed)
Lady St Helier, Municipal Reform (re-appointed)
Charles James Mathew, Progressive (retiring Councillor)
Henry Evan Auguste Cotton, Progressive (retiring Councillor)
Henry de Rosenbach Walker, Progressive (retiring Councillor)
Katherine Talbot Wallas, Progressive (former Alderman)
Albert Emil Davies, Labour

By-elections 1919–1922
There were five by-elections to fill casual vacancies during the term of the tenth London County Council.

City of London, 1 December 1919
Cause: resignation of Sir Rowland Blades 11 November 1919

Southwark North, 13 May 1920
 Cause: resignation of Duchess of Marlborough, 27 April 1920

Wandsworth, Clapham, 2 May 1921
 Cause: death of Herbert Francis Golds, 9 April 1921

Wandsworth, Streatham, 9 May 1921
Cause: resignation of A C Thomas 26 April 1921

Battersea South, 28 June 1921
 Cause: death of William Hammond, 10 June 1921

Aldermanic vacancies filled 1919–1922
There were six casual vacancies among the aldermen in the term of the tenth London County Council, which were filled as follows: 
8 July 1919: Alfred Fowell Buxton (Municipal Reform) to serve until 1922 in place of Sir George Dashwood Taubman Goldie, resigned 1 July 1919. Buxton had previously served two aldermanic terms from 1904 to 1916. 
24 February 1920: Arthur Acland Allen (Progressive) to serve until 1922 in place of the Hon. Oswald Partington, resigned 10 February 1920. Allen had previously served as a councillor from 1899 to 1913.
20 July 1920: George Sitwell Campbell Swinton (Municipal Reform) to serve until 1922 in place of Herbert James Francis Parsons, resigned 3 July 1920. Swinton had previously sat a councillor from 1901 to 1907 and as an alderman from 1907 to 1912.
2 November 1920: Sir Godfrey Baring (Progressive) to serve until 1922 in place of George Alexander Hardy, died 2 October 1920.
8 February 1921: Sir Philip Gutterez Henriques (Municipal Reform) to serve until 1925 in place of Bernard Henry Holland, resigned 25 January 1921.
15 March 1921: Viscount Hill (Municipal Reform) to serve until 1925 in place of Howard Willmott Liversidge, resigned 8 March 1921. Hill had previously sat as a councillor from 1910 to 1919.

References

1919 elections in the United Kingdom
County Council election
1919 English local elections
London County Council elections
March 1919 events